Utmanzai is a town in Charsadda tehsil of Charsadda District in the Khyber Pakhtunkhwa province of Pakistan. It is located at the border between Mohmand Agency and Charsadda District.

Overview 
It is one of the eight main villages of Hashtnagar (one of the two constituent parts of Charsadda District in Khyber Pakhtunkhwa). It is present on Main Tangi road between Rajjar and Turangzai.

Utmanzai is the birthplace of famous Pakhtun leader and Frontier Gandhi, Khan Abdul Ghaffar Khan (famously known as Bacha Khan). Among other notable political figures, educationalists and thinkers who belong to the village are Khan Abdul Ghani Khan, Khan Abdul Wali Khan, Khan Abdul Ali Khan, Khan Abdul Jabbar Khan (known as Doctor Khan Saib), Major General Akbar Khan, Nisar Muhammad Khan and Lieutenant General Imran Ullah Khan.

Utmanzai, is the centre of regional and national politics because it is the birthplace of Khudai Khidmatgar Tehreek, a movement which played a crucial role in the struggle against British Raj.

The main ethnic group in Utmanzai is Muhammadzai; however, there are further 4–5 ethnic subgroups, including Shamozai, Parich, Khel, Khwazi Khel, Peeran, Katikan, Julagan and several others that are few in number.

Population 
The population of Utmanzai, according to the 1998 census, is 19,530. The population of Utmanzai according to the official census over the years is shown in the table below.

See also 
 Shabqadar
 Shabqadar Tehsil
 Charsadda District

References

Charsadda District, Pakistan
Populated places in Charsadda District, Pakistan